Kim Sang-min (born 23 May 1989) is a South Korean professional footballer who plays as a central defender for PS TIRA in the Liga 1.

Career

Early years
Kim played for Nagacorp FC and Ceres, where he won United Football League in 2015.

Minerva Punjab
Kim played his first game in India playing for Minerva Punjab in the I-League against Bengaluru FC, which Minerva Punjab lost by a solitary goal.

Honors
Ceres
 United Football League: 2015; runner-up: 2016
 UFL Cup runner-up: 2016

References

1989 births
Living people
South Korean footballers
South Korean expatriate footballers
RoundGlass Punjab FC players
Association football defenders
I-League players
Expatriate footballers in Cambodia
South Korean expatriate sportspeople in Cambodia
Expatriate footballers in the Philippines
Expatriate footballers in India
Ceres–Negros F.C. players
Nagaworld FC players